Timothy L. "Tim" Spear was a  Democratic member of the North Carolina General Assembly, representing the state's second House district, including constituents in Chowan, Dare, Gates, Perquimans and Tyrrell counties. He was originally appointed to the position in January 2006 to replace William T. Culpepper III who had resigned.

Recent Electoral History

References

External links
NC General Assembly official profile
Project Vote Smart profile
Follow the Money - Timothy L. Spear
2008 2006 campaign contributions

Members of the North Carolina House of Representatives
Living people
21st-century American politicians
Year of birth missing (living people)